Roland Eugene Muirhead (24 July 1868 – 2 August 1964) was a Scottish businessman and Scottish nationalist politician.

Muirhead was born in Lochwinnoch, Renfrewshire, the second son of Andrew Muirhead, a businessman and owner of the Gryffe Tannery, and his wife, Isabella Reid. Roland was a member of the Young Scots' Society but left in 1914 due to pacifist objections to Liberal Party support for Britain's involvement in the First World War. He became a member of the Independent Labour Party from 1918 but later left, becoming first chairman of the National Party of Scotland. He was on the left of the Scottish National Party (SNP) following its creation from the National Party of Scotland and the Scottish Party and served as president 1936 to 1950. He opposed conscription during the Second World War.   A letter to a Nazi agent, Dr Von Teffenar, was found at his home.

In 1950, Muirhead formed the Scottish National Congress, a direct action group focused on campaigning for Scottish Home Rule.  While remaining a leading member of the SNP, he devoted most of his time to the new group and, ultimately, the production of a proposed Scottish constitution.

He died in 1964 and was buried at his home town of Lochwinnoch. In 1968 a plaque was unveiled at his former home in commemoration.

Tom Johnston MP, a lifelong friend of Muirhead, and Labour Secretary of State for Scotland during the 2nd World War Coalition government, stated that Roland Muirhead was 'the greatest patriot which Renfrewshire has produced since William Wallace'

References

 
 Kemp, Arnold, "Roland Muirhead's fight for a Scottish Parliament", .

1868 births
1964 deaths
Presidents of the Scottish National Party
Scottish National Party parliamentary candidates
Scottish pacifists